The 1992–93 Nationale 1 season was the 72nd season of the Nationale 1, the top level of ice hockey in France. 16 teams participated in the league, and the Dragons de Rouen won their third league title. Diables Rouges de Valenciennes was relegated to the Nationale 2.

First round

Southern Group

Northern Group

Second round

N1C Group

N1B Group

5th-8th place playoffs

N1A Group

Playoffs

External links
Season on hockeyarchives.info

France
1992–93 in French ice hockey
Ligue Magnus seasons